Anatoly Lesun (born February 27, 1959, Parichi, Svietlahorsk District) is a Russian political figure and a deputy of the 8th State Duma. In 2010, he was granted a Doctor of Sciences in Technical sciences degree.

From 1993 to 1998, Lesun worked at the Kirov branch of the Gorky Railway, first as the deputy head and, later, as the head. In 1998, he was appointed the head of the Kirov representative office of the Gorky Railway. In 2009-2021, Lesun served as the head of the Gorky Railway. On March 13, 2011, Lesun was elected deputy of the Legislative Assembly of Nizhny Novgorod Oblast. Since September 2021, he has served as deputy of the 8th State Duma.

References

1959 births
Living people
United Russia politicians
21st-century Russian politicians
Eighth convocation members of the State Duma (Russian Federation)
People from Svietlahorsk District